Solitary: Inside Red Onion State Prison is a documentary film by HBO about Red Onion State Prison, a supermax prison, in the U.S. state of Virginia.

References

External links
 
 Solitary: Inside Red Onion State Prison on HBO
 

2016 television films
2016 films
Documentary films about incarceration in the United States
HBO documentary films
2010s English-language films
2010s American films